Potamia is a village and a community of the Agia municipality. The 2011 census recorded 262 inhabitants in the village. The community of Potamia covers an area of 32.899 km2.

Geography
The village is located 6 km southeast of Agia, at the northern slopes of Mavrovouni Mountain.

Population
According to the 2011 census, the population of the settlement of Potamia was 262 people, a decrease of almost 12% compared with the population of the previous census of 2001.

See also
 List of settlements in the Larissa regional unit

References

Populated places in Larissa (regional unit)